The United States Military District was a land tract in central Ohio that was established by the Congress to compensate veterans of the American Revolutionary War for their service. The tract contains  in Noble, Guernsey, Tuscarawas, Muskingum, Coshocton, Holmes, Licking, Knox, Franklin, Delaware, Morrow, and Marion counties.

History

The Congress had little money to pay the soldiers who fought for independence.  They made promises of land to induce army enlistment.  By resolutions of September 16 and 18, 1776, and August 12, September 22, and October 3, 1780, they proposed to give each officer or private continuously to serve in the United States army until the close of the war, or until discharged, or to the representatives of those slain by the enemy, the amounts in the table.

Under the Land Ordinance of 1785, land was made available in the Seven Ranges for bounties, but this proved inadequate.

Location and subdivision

On June 1, 1796, Congress created the United States Military District, sometimes called the USMD Lands, or USMD Survey. It turned out that the Tuscarawas River leg was unnecessary because Fort Laurens happens to be due west of the Seven Ranges Terminus. This tract contains 2,539,110 acres. Survey of the land began in March, 1797. The land was to be divided into survey townships five miles (8 km) square (16000 acres), the only instance of a government conducted survey not based on the six mile (10 km) square township standard of the Public Land Survey System. Other instances of five mile square townships were for the Firelands and Connecticut Western Reserve, which were privately surveyed. Ranges were numbered starting from the meridian along the east edge, and townships were numbered starting from the baseline along the south of the tract. The quarter townships were numbered starting with 1 in the northeast and proceeding anti-clockwise. The Act of March 1, 1800 provided for dividing quarter townships into lots of  each, 880 yards in width by 550 yards in height.

On March 3, 1803, the unclaimed land was divided into one mile (1.6 km) square sections and into half sections, and sold as essentially Congress Lands by the Chillicothe and Zanesville land offices.

Claims

In the USMD, as elsewhere in the surveyed lands, many veterans sold their warrants to speculators or jobbers at a fraction of their true value. Of the  claimed by land warrant,  were patented to just 22 persons. The actual location of the 262 quarter townships claimed by military warrants was determined by a drawing. Few absentee owners ever visited their land, and fewer still spent any time on it. They sold it, sight unseen, as a speculative venture, often paying no regard to any attachment of sale made by Ohio officials for delinquent taxes.

By 1823, the United States government had issued 10,958 warrants for service in the Revolutionary War totaling , and more were issued under various laws thereafter. These warrants could only be used in the USMD except for those used in the Ohio Company lands or in the Symmes Purchase. Veterans who held on to their warrants finally received relief by the act of May 30, 1830, which allowed them to exchange their warrants for land scrip issued in  amounts, good for $1.25 an acre on land anywhere in the public domain available for private entry. Researchers will find that land scrip could be bought cheaply, depending on market conditions. Its use in land transactions does not infer the holder was entitled to it by military service. Veterans often sold their land scrip to land jobbers.

Exclusions

The Moravian Indian Grants at the Tuscarawas County villages of Schoenbrunn, Gnaddenhutten and Salem are independent  surveys, not on the same grid, within the USMD.  Part of the independent “Muskingum River Survey” of Zane's Tracts also lies in the USMD.

See also
Ohio Lands
Historic regions of the United States
Military Tract of 1812 - a similar tract set aside for War of 1812 veterans.

Notes

References

External links

Former regions and territories of the United States
Veterans' affairs in the United States
Geography of Ohio
Pre-statehood history of Ohio
History of the Midwestern United States
Surveying of the United States
Coshocton County, Ohio
Delaware County, Ohio
Franklin County, Ohio
Guernsey County, Ohio
Holmes County, Ohio
Knox County, Ohio
Licking County, Ohio
Marion County, Ohio
Morrow County, Ohio
Muskingum County, Ohio
Noble County, Ohio
Tuscarawas County, Ohio
Veterans' settlement schemes